The 2005 U.S. Men's Clay Court Championships was an Association of Tennis Professionals men's tennis tournament held in Houston, Texas in the United States. The event was played on outdoor clay courts and was part of the International Series of the 2005 ATP Tour. It was the 37th edition of the tournament and was held from April 18 to April 25, 2005. First-seeded Andy Roddick won the singles tournament.

Finals

Singles

 Andy Roddick defeated  Sébastien Grosjean 6–2, 6–2
 It was Roddick's 2nd title of the year and the 19th of his career.

Doubles

 Mark Knowles /  Daniel Nestor defeated  Martín García /  Luis Horna 6–3, 6–4
 It was Knowles's 2nd title of the year and the 37th of his career. It was Nestor's 2nd title of the year and the 39th of his career.

References

External links 
Association of Tennis Professionals (ATP) – tournament profile

 
U.S. Men's Clay Court Championships
U.S. Men's Clay Court Championships
U.S. Men's Clay Court Championships
U.S. Men's Clay Court Championships
U.S. Men's Clay Court Championships